Paolo and Francesca is a painting by the French artist Jean-Auguste-Dominique Ingres, produced in seven known versions between 1814 and 1850. It derives from the story of Paolo and Francesca in Dante's Inferno. With Ingres' The Engagement of Raphael, these works represent early examples of the troubador style.

Of the seven known versions, that in the Musée des beaux-arts d'Angers is considered the most complete, notably in the exaggerated form of Paolo, whose neck recalls the same artist's Jupiter and Thetis. The frontality of the composition and the details of the room and clothes refer back to the Northern Renaissance.

Links
 History of series

Bibliography
Daniel Ternois, Ingres, Paris, Fernand Nathan, 1980
Robert Rosenblum, Ingres, Paris, Cercle d'Art, coll. « La Bibliothèque des Grands Peintres », 1986

1819 paintings
Paintings by Jean-Auguste-Dominique Ingres
Paintings in Angers
Paintings based on works by Dante Alighieri
Paintings in the collection of the Museo Soumaya
Cultural depictions of Francesca da Rimini
Works based on Inferno (Dante)